The primates of Colombia include 41 extant species in 13 genera and five families. Additionally, 12 fossil species in 10 genera and five families have been identified in Colombia, mainly at the La Venta Lagerstätte of the Honda Group, mostly from the so-called "Monkey Unit", "Monkey Beds" or "Monkey Locality", the richest site for fossil primates in South America. As of 2013, of the 30 fossil primate species found in South America dating to the Late Oligocene (26 Ma) to the Pleistocene, twelve are described from the Honda Group. The genera Branisella, Caipora, Carlocebus, Chilecebus, Dolichocebus, Homunculus, Killikaike, Mazzonicebus, Proteropithecia, Protopithecus, Soriacebus, Szalatavus and Tremacebus have been discovered in Argentina, Bolivia, Brazil, Chile, Ecuador and Peru and are not known from Colombia. Additionally, Antillothrix, Insulacebus (both Hispaniola), Paralouatta (Cuba) and Xenothrix (Jamaica) were restricted to the Caribbean. The discovery of Perupithecus, described in 2015 from the Late Eocene (35-36 Ma) Santa Rosa fauna in the Yahuarango Formation of the Peruvian Amazon, pushes back the evolutionary lineage of New World primates.

Extant primates

Fossil primates

See also 

 List of Central American monkey species
 List of mammals of Colombia
 Biodiversity of Colombia
 Fauna of Colombia

References

Bibliography 
 
 
 
 
 
 
 
 
 
 
 
 
 

Primates
P
Colombia